Kimberly Elise Trammel (born April 17, 1967) is an American film and television actress. She made her feature film debut in Set It Off (1996), and later received critical acclaim for her performance in Beloved (1998).

During her career, Elise has appeared in films such as John Q. (2002), The Manchurian Candidate (2004), Diary of a Mad Black Woman (2005), The Great Debaters (2007), For Colored Girls (2010), Dope (2015), Almost Christmas (2016), Death Wish (2018), and Ad Astra (2019).

She received a nomination for Independent Spirit Award for Best Female Lead for her performance in the 2004 drama film, Woman Thou Art Loosed, and played the leading roles in a number of made for television movies. Elise also starred in the CBS crime drama series, Close to Home (2005–07), and in 2013 began starring in the VH1 comedy-drama series, Hit the Floor. She is a four-time NAACP Image Awards winner.

Early life
Elise was born as Kimberly Elise Trammel in Minneapolis, Minnesota, the daughter of Erma Jean (née Johnson), an elementary school teacher, and Marvin Trammel, who owns an executive search firm. She has three siblings. She attended The American Film Institute as a Directing Fellow and at the University of Minnesota  earned a BA in Mass Communications.

Career

1990s
Elise made her big screen debut in the 1996 crime action film  Set It Off (1996) directed by F. Gary Gray, in which she played one of four women who resort to robbing a bank for money. Jada Pinkett Smith, Queen Latifah and Vivica A. Fox co-star in film which became a critical and box office success, grossing over $41 million. In 1997 she was cast in the Family Channel original television movie The Ditchdigger's Daughters, based on the Pulitzer-prize nominated and critically acclaimed 1995 memoir The Ditchdigger's Daughters: A Black Family's Astonishing Success Story, written by Yvonne S. Thornton and Jo Coudert. She received critical acclaim for her role in this film, and in 1997, she was recognized as Best Supporting Actress in a Movie or Miniseries at the 19th annual CableACE Awards. Her performance helped her land a role the next year in Beloved alongside Oprah Winfrey and Danny Glover, a horror-drama film based on Toni Morrison's 1987 novel of the same name, directed by Jonathan Demme. Despite being a box office bomb,  Elise received praise for her performance, and well as Chicago Film Critics Association Award for Most Promising Actress and Satellite Award for Best Supporting Actress – Motion Picture. She also received her first NAACP Image Award nomination.

2000s
In 2000, Elise starred in The Loretta Claiborne Story playing Loretta Claiborne. The movie was aired as a part of The Wonderful World of Disney at ABC in early 2000. She received good reviews for performance as Claiborne. Later that year, she was female lead in Jamie Foxx's movie Bait, the film was a huge financial failure, and received mostly negative reviews from critics. The following year, she starred opposite Gregory Hines in the biographical drama Bojangles. In 2002–2003, she made guest appearances on the UPN comedy series Girlfriends in which she played an HIV-positive woman, and in the Showtime drama Soul Food.

In 2002, Elise starred alongside Denzel Washington in the crime film John Q. It became a box office success, grossing over $100 million. She next had a leading role in the independent drama Woman Thou Art Loosed portraying Michelle, an abused young woman who finally got the help she needed behind bars. This role won her a Black Reel award for Best Actress and well as received Independent Spirit Award for Best Female Lead nomination. She later starred in the political thriller The Manchurian Candidate, co-starring with Denzel Washington a second time.

In 2005, Elise went to star in the comedy drama film Diary of a Mad Black Woman written by Tyler Perry and directed by Darren Grant. she received positive reviews for her performance, while film received mostly negative reviews. The film still was huge box office success, grossing over $50 million against a budget of $5 million. She won her first NAACP Image Award for Outstanding Actress in a Motion Picture for this movie. From 2005 to 2007, Elise starred in the CBS crime drama series Close to Home, playing the Marion County, Indiana (Indianapolis) prosecutor Maureen Scofield. Her character was killed off in the last episode of the series. The series was cancelled in May 2007. She received NAACP Image Award for Outstanding Actress in a Drama Series in 2006 for this series. She later guest starred in two Shonda Rhimes' dramas; Private Practice in 2007, and Grey's Anatomy in 2009.

In 2007, Elise has appeared in two biographical drama films. First was Pride opposite Terrence Howard based upon the true story of Philadelphia swim coach Jim Ellis. Later, she appeared again opposite Denzel Washington in The Great Debaters, based on an article written about the Wiley College debate team by Tony Scherman for the spring 1997 issue of American Legacy. in 2009, she starred opposite Cuba Gooding Jr. in the television film Gifted Hands: The Ben Carson Story, winning NAACP Image Award for Outstanding Actress in a Television Movie, Mini-Series or Dramatic Special.

2010s
In 2010, Elise starred in the drama film For Colored Girls as the battered wife Crystal. The film is based on Ntozake Shange's 1975 original choreopoem for colored girls who have considered suicide / when the rainbow is enuf, and was written, directed and produced by Tyler Perry. While the film itself received mixed to negative reviews, her performance was praised by many critics. One journalist described her as "the great lost Best Supporting Actress contender of the 2010 season". Lisa Schwarzbaum of Entertainment Weekly comments: "The female cast is great, with especially fierce performances from Loretta Devine, Kimberly Elise, Phylicia Rashad, and Anika Noni Rose. But stuck in a flailing production that might just as well invite Perry's signature drag creation Madea to the block party, the actors' earnest work isn't enuf." She won NAACP Image Award for Outstanding Supporting Actress in a Motion Picture for her performance.

Elise has had starring roles in a number of independent films in 2000s, include a leading role in Ties That Bind (2011). She co-starred alongside Whoopi Goldberg in the Lifetime television film A Day Late and a Dollar Short in 2014. In 2013, she began starring in the VH1 comedy-drama series Hit The Floor. In 2015, she has appeared in the well-received comedy-drama film Dope, and the following year co-starred opposite Kerry Washington in the HBO film Confirmation. Later in 2016, Elise starred in the Christmas comedy-drama film Almost Christmas opposite Danny Glover, Gabrielle Union and Mo'Nique. She next starred in Death Wish opposite Bruce Willis, a remake of the 1974 film of the same name. In 2019, she appeared in the science fiction film Ad Astra.

2020s
In 2020, Elise was cast opposite Justin Theroux in the Apple TV+ drama series The Mosquito Coast based on the 1981 novel by Paul Theroux.

Personal life
Elise was married to Maurice Oldham from 1989 to 2005. The couple had two daughters, born in 1990 and 1998. Not long after their divorce, in 2007, Oldham died from a "massive blood clot".

Elise is vegan and has worked with PETA to promote the lifestyle.

In 2022, soon after the overturning of Roe v. Wade by the Supreme Court of the United States, Elise took to Instagram to praise the justices for their ruling when she wrote:

Filmography

Film

Television

Awards and nominations
Acapulco Black Film Festival
1999: Nominated – Best Actress for Beloved (1998)

African-American Film Critics Association
2010: Won – Best Supporting Actress for For Colored Girls

Black Reel Awards
2002: Won – Best Supporting Actress for Bojangles (2001)
2003: Nominated – Best Actress for John Q (2002)
2005: Nominated – Best Supporting Actress for The Manchurian Candidate (2004)
2005: Won – Best Actress, Independent Film for Woman Thou Art Loosed (2004)
2006: Won – Best Actress for Diary of a Mad Black Woman
2011: Nominated – Best Actress for For Colored Girls
2011: Won – Outstanding Ensemble for For Colored Girls

CableACE Award
1997: Won – Supporting Actress in a Movie or Miniseries for The Ditchdigger's Daughters (1997)

Chicago Film Critics Association Awards
1999: Won – Most Promising Actress for Beloved (1998)
1999: Nominated – Best Supporting Actress for Beloved (1998)

Golden Satellite Awards
1999: Won – Best Actress in a Supporting Role in a Motion Picture – Drama for Beloved (1998)

NAACP Image Awards
1999: Nominated – Outstanding Supporting Actress in a Motion Picture for Beloved (1998)
2002: Nominated – Outstanding Actress in a Television Movie, Mini-Series or Dramatic Special for Bojangles (2001)
2003: Nominated – Outstanding Supporting Actress in a Motion Picture for John Q (2002)
2003: Nominated – Image Award Outstanding Supporting Actress in a Drama Series for "Soul Food" (2000)
2005: Nominated – Image Award Outstanding Actress in a Motion Picture for Woman Thou Art Loosed (2004)
2006: Winner – Image Award Outstanding Actress in a Motion Picture for Diary of a Mad Black Woman
2006: Nominated – Outstanding Actress in a Drama Series for Close to Home
2007: Winner – Outstanding Actress in a Drama Series for Close to Home
2010: Winner – NAACP Image Award for Outstanding Actress in a Television Movie, Mini-Series or Dramatic Special for Gifted Hands: The Ben Carson Story
2011: Winner – Image Award Outstanding Actress in a Motion Picture for For Colored Girls
Independent Spirit Awards
2005: Nominated – Best Female Lead for Woman Thou Art Loosed (2004)

References

External links

Kimberly Elise Talks About Woman, Thou Art Loosed

1967 births
Actresses from Minneapolis
American people of Malian descent
American people of Songhai descent
Living people
University of Minnesota School of Journalism and Mass Communication alumni
20th-century American actresses
21st-century American actresses
African-American actresses
American television actresses
American film actresses
African-American Christians
20th-century African-American women
20th-century African-American people
21st-century African-American women
21st-century African-American people